Jay Jacobs may refer to:
Jay Jacobs (retailer), American clothing retailer
 Jay Jacobs (businessman) (1911/12-2013), American founder of the retailer
 Jay Jacobs (athletic director), director of athletics for the Auburn Tigers athletic department
 Jay Jacobs (broadcaster) (born 1938), color analyst and retired public school administrator
 Jay Jacobs (politician) (born 1953), American politician and member of the Maryland House of Delegates
 Jay Jacobs (executive), president of PIMCO

Jacobs, Jay